Paulia is a genus of lichenized fungi within the family Lichinaceae. It contains five species.

The genus name of Paulia is in honour of Paul Fée, the father of the author Antoine Laurent Apollinaire Fée.

The genus was circumscribed in Linnaea Vol.10 on page 466 in 1836.

References

External links
Paulia at Index Fungorum

Lichinomycetes
Lichen genera
Taxa named by Antoine Laurent Apollinaire Fée